Senra is a flowering plant genus in the tribe Hibisceae.

References

Hibisceae
Malvaceae genera
Taxa named by Antonio José Cavanilles